"Violet" is a song by Seal. "Violet" was released as the fifth and final single from his debut album Seal – although the version on the single is actually an acoustic, live version, recorded (among five other tracks from the album) for inclusion on the video version of the album. The acoustic version is a simple arrangement, half the length of the original version.

The video, also titled Seal, opens with the six-track live segment (which was also released as a promo CD "The Acoustic Session" in the US) and is followed by promo video clips of the first four singles taken from the album.

The random dialogue that appears in the song is from the 1987 movie "The Sicilian" which Seal watched & became inspired by, & was the reason why this song was written.

Charts

1992 singles
1991 songs
ZTT Records singles
Sire Records singles
Songs written by Guy Sigsworth
Songs written by Seal (musician)
Song recordings produced by Trevor Horn